The 1966–67 season was Fussball Club Basel 1893's 73rd season in their existence. It was their 21st consecutive season in the top flight of Swiss football after their promotion the season 1945–46. They now played their home games in the St. Jakob Stadium, in the south-eastern end of the city and no longer in their old stadium Landhof. Harry Thommen took over as club chairman at the AGM from Lucien Schmidlin who retired and became vice-chairman.

Overview

Pre-season
During this season Helmut Benthaus was the club player-manager for the second consecutive season. There were only a few minor changes in the squad. Walter Baumann moved to La Chaux-de-Fonds, Silvan Schwager moved to St. Gallen and Bruno Gabrieli moved to Grasshopper Club. Peter Füri moved on to SC Binningen and here he ended his football career. In the other direction Peter Ramseier joined the club from Cantonal Neuchatel and Anton Schnyder joined from Servette.

Domestic league
There were 14 teams contesting in the 1966–67 Nationalliga A and Basel finished the seasons as champions just one point clear of both FC Zürich in second position and FC Lugano who finished third. Basel won 16 of the 26 games, drawing eight, losing twice, and they scored 60 goals conceding just 20. Roberto Frigerio was the team's top goal scorer with 16 league goals, Helmut Hauser second best goal scorer with 14. In the highest scoring game of the season, a 10–0 win against FC Moutier Roberto 'Mucho' Frigerio managed to score four and in the test game against FC Allschwil he scored six in the 9–1 victory.

Swiss Cup
In the Swiss Cup Basel started in the round of 32 with a 6–0 home win against Blue Stars and in the round of 16, also a home match, they beat FC Zürich 3–2. In the Quarter-final Basel won the replay against Biel-Bienne 2–1 to qualify for the semi-finals. Basel played an away match in the Stadio Cornaredo against FC Lugano in the semi-final which ended goalless and therefore a replay was required here too. The replay was played in the St. Jakob Stadium and goals from Karl Odermatt and Helmut Benthaus gave Basel a 2–1 victory to qualify for the final which was to take place three days later.

In the Cup final Basel's opponents were Lausanne-Sports. In the former Wankdorf Stadium on 15 May 1967, Helmut Hauser scored the decisive goal via penalty. The game went down in football history due to the sit-down strike that followed this goal. After 88 minutes of play, with the score at 1–1, referee Karl Göppel awarded Basel a controversial penalty. André Grobéty had pushed Hauser gently in the back and he let himself drop theatrically. Subsequent to the 2–1 for Basel the Lausanne players refused to resume the game and they sat down demonstratively on the pitch. The referee had to abandon the match. Basel were awarded the cup with a 3–0 forfait.

Basel had won the double for the first time in the club's history.

Inter-Cities Fairs Cup
In the first round of the 1966–67 Inter-Cities Fairs Cup Basel were drawn against VV DOS Utrecht. The first leg was played in the Netherlands and ended in a 2–1 defeat, despite an early lead. In the return leg Basel led 2–0 but VV DOS were able to equalise and therefore won 4–3 on aggregate.

Players 

 
 
 
 
 

 
 
 
 
 

 
 
 
 
 

 
 
 
} 

Players who left the squad

Results 
Legend

Friendly matches

Pre-season

Winter break

Nationalliga A

League matches

League table

Swiss Cup

The final was abandoned in 89' at 2-1 and awarded 3-0 in favour of Basel: Lausanne-Sports protested by a sit-in against the penalty decision that led to 2-1.

Inter-Cities Fairs Cup

First round

Utrecht won 4 – 3 on aggregate.

See also
 History of FC Basel
 List of FC Basel players
 List of FC Basel seasons

References

Notes

Sources and references 
 Rotblau: Jahrbuch Saison 2014/2015. Publisher: FC Basel Marketing AG. 
 Die ersten 125 Jahre. Publisher: Josef Zindel im Friedrich Reinhardt Verlag, Basel. 
 Switzerland 1966–67 at RSSSF
 Inter-Cities Fairs Cup 1966-67 at RSSSF

External links
 FC Basel official site

FC Basel seasons
Basel
1966-67